Nicole Danielle Dubuc (born November 6, 1978) is an American actress and writer, known for her work on the Transformers franchise, including Transformers: Prime, Rescue Bots, Rescue Bots Academy, Robots in Disguise and Transformers: EarthSpark.

Child actress
As a child actress, Dubuc had a recurring role as Bertha on the television series Our House and a guest appearance on the television series ALF. She starred in the popular sitcom Major Dad, playing the character Robin Cooper MacGillis. She appeared in all 96 episodes during the show's run between 1989 and 1993.

She worked as a child actress for 11 years, including background voices for Prince of Tides and Searching for Bobby Fischer.

Adult career
After graduation, she got her first work as an apprentice staff writer on the hit series, Kim Possible. She continues to act as an adult and voiced Iris West-Allen in Young Justice.

She was recently cast as Skywarp and Nova Storm in Transformers: EarthSpark.

As a crew member 
She has more than 200 television and feature writing credits, including Jackie Chan Adventures, W.I.T.C.H., The Spectacular Spider-Man and Young Justice. She was the story editor and writer on the Disney series, My Friends Tigger & Pooh. She co-created Transformers: Rescue Bots with Brian Hohlfeld and Jeff Kline, served as story editor and writer, then became executive producer as of the show's fourth season.  She created, executive produced, and story edited the show's spinoff, Transformers: Rescue Bots Academy.

She was an executive producer and story editor on My Little Pony: Friendship Is Magic, where she also wrote some of the songs and episodes. She was the showrunner for The Rocketeer, a series she developed for Disney Junior.

She is the first woman to write for The Flash in DC Comics, with the story "Details" appearing in 2013's The Flash Annual (volume 4) #2 of the publisher's relaunch, The New 52.

She and Michael Vogel are co-writers of a new My Little Pony: Ponyville Mysteries series of books, under the pen name "Penumbra Quill".

She served on the executive board of the Animation Guild, I.A.T.S.E. Local 839 for nine years (six as a trustee and three as recording secretary).

She has written the lyrics for four theme songs, including Transformers: Rescue Bots, Transformers: Rescue Bots Academy, The Rocketeer, and Hello Megan (co-written with Greg Weisman for the show-within-the-show in Young Justice).

Dubuc served as an executive producer on Transformers: Rescue Bots Academy and Transformers: EarthSpark. She is currently showrunning a new show entitled "HexVet" for Nickelodeon.

Awards
Dubuc has earned eight Emmy nominations, in 2005, 2006 and 2007 for Outstanding Children's Animated Program for ToddWorld, in 2011 for "Outstanding Writing in Animation" for Transformers: Prime, in 2014 for "Outstanding Writing in a Children's Series" for R.L. Stine's The Haunting Hour, in 2015 for "Outstanding Writing in Children's Series" for Spooksville, in 2016 for "Outstanding Writing in an Animated Program" for Transformers: Rescue Bots and in 2020 for "Outstanding Writing for a Preschool Animated Program" for The Rocketeer.

She recently won the Writers Guild of America West's 2018 Animation Writers Caucus Animation Writing Award for her lifetime achievement in animation.

As a child actress, she won a Clio Award for the commercial, "Buffy's Bedtime".

Personal life
Dubuc grew up in Orange County, California. She attended Yale University and graduated pre-med with a degree in English.

She is married to Brian Hohlfeld.

Filmography

Television
 Our House (1986–1988) - Bertha
 ALF (1988) - Hannah (Ep. "You Ain't Nothin' But a Hound Dog")
 Major Dad (1989–1993) - Robin Cooper MacGillis
 Young Justice (2011–2019) - Iris West-Allen (voice)
 Transformers: Rescue Bots (2014–2016) - Mrs. Luskey, C.A.T., Poopsie (voices)
 Miles from Tomorrowland (2015–2016) - Nuala (voice)
 The Rocketeer (2019–2020) - Honey (voice)
 Transformers: EarthSpark (2022-present) - Skywarp, Nova Storm (voice)

Film
 Mike DA Mustang (2011) - Aileron (voice)
 The Hunted (2015) - Intern

Crew work

Writer
 series head writer denoted in bold

Television writing
 Kim Possible (2003–2005)
 ToddWorld (2004–2005)
 Dragon Tales (2005)
 Jackie Chan Adventures (2005)
 The Zula Patrol (2005)
 Pinky Dinky Doo (2005)
 W.I.T.C.H. (2006)
 JoJo's Circus (2006)
 Catscratch (2006–2007)
 My Friends Tigger & Pooh (2007–2008)
 Care Bears: Adventures in Care-a-Lot (2007–2008)
 Tak and the Power of Juju (2007–2008)
 Mickey Mouse Clubhouse (2008)
 The Spectacular Spider-Man (2009)
 Ben 10: Alien Force (2009)
 The Super Hero Squad Show (2009–2011)
 Transformers: Prime (2010–2012)
 Jake and the Never Land Pirates (2011)
 Gaspard and Lisa (2011)
 Young Justice (2011–2013, 2019)
 Hero: 108 (2012)
 Transformers: Rescue Bots (2012, 2014–2016)
 Teenage Mutant Ninja Turtles (2013)
 The Haunting Hour: The Series (2013–2014)
 Spooksville (2014)
 Transformers: Robots in Disguise (2015)
 Miles from Tomorrowland (2015–2016)
 Star Wars Rebels (2016–2017)
 The Octonauts (2016–2017)
 Lego Elves: Secrets of Elvendale (2017)
 Sunny Day (2017)
 My Little Pony: Friendship is Magic (2017–2019)
 Star Wars Forces of Destiny (2018)
 The Rocketeer (2019–2020)
 Transformers: Rescue Bots Academy (2019–2021)
 Pacific Rim: The Black (2021-2022)

Film writing
 Super Sleuth Christmas Movie (2007)
 Tigger & Pooh and a Musical Too (2009)
 Mike DA Mustang (2011)
 Postman Pat: The Movie (2014)

Producer

Television producing
 Transformers: Rescue Bots (2016)
 Lego Elves: Secrets of Elvendale (2017)
 My Little Pony: Friendship is Magic (2018-2019)
 The Rocketeer (2019-2020)
 Transformers: Rescue Bots Academy (2019-2021)
 Transformers: EarthSpark (2022-present) 
 HexVet

Film producing
 My Little Pony: Best Gift Ever (2018)
 My Little Pony: Rainbow Roadtrip (2019)

References

External links

1978 births
Living people
American women screenwriters
American screenwriters
American television actresses
American television writers
American child actresses
American women television writers
21st-century American women